Maria Weigert Brendel (December 18, 1902–1994) was a German expert on classical art. She studied at the University of Heidelberg, before being pulled out of the University by her father, and being forced to flee the country to avoid Nazi persecution. Later in her life, she posthumously published a number of Otto Brendel's works.

Biography

Early life

Born to director of the state court Erich Weigert and the daughter of a banker, Maria Weigert was the first girl to attend a normally boys only German Gymnasium. She was childhood friends with Dietrich Bonhoeffer. She went on to study at the University of Heidelberg, studying with Professor Ludwig Curtius. It was there that she met her future husband, Otto Brendel. When she was almost finished with her degree, while writing her dissertation on the Ludovisi Throne, her father discovered her relationship with Brendel and pulled her out of the university, ending her doctoral career.

Marriage and child
Weigert married Otto Brendel in 1929. In 1931, they moved near the University of Erlangen for Otto's new position. Their daughter, artist and painter Cornelia Brendel Foss, was born there in 1931. Cornelia married musician and composer Lukas Foss.

Life and works 
In 1932, the family moved to Rome for Otto's position as First Assistant at the German Archaeological Institute, but in 1936, Otto was dismissed from his post because he was married to Maria, a non-Aryan. Maria moved back to Berlin with Cornelia, living under a false name so nobody suspected her Jewish identity. On September 3, 1939, Maria and Cornelia left Germany and immigrated to St. Louis, Missouri, where Otto was already living. In 1956, they moved to New York City, where both Maria and Otto were actively involved in the Archaeology Club. Other members included Dorothy Hill, Homer and Dorothy Thompson, Frances Follin Jones of the Princeton Art Gallery, and Evelyn Harrison.

After Otto died in September 1973, Maria began to publish and distribute a number of Otto's unfinished works.  She translated The Symbolism of the Sphere from German into English, and an article on "Iphigeneia in Tauris in Euripides and Goethe" from English to German. She arranged for Emeline Richardson to complete his book Etruscan Art, and later for Francesca Serra Ridgway to write the second edition. She was involved in the posthumous publication of Festschrift in his honor.

References

German art historians
American art historians
Women art historians
Heidelberg University alumni
People from Berlin
1902 births
1994 deaths
Jewish emigrants from Nazi Germany to the United States
German women historians
20th-century German women writers
American women historians
20th-century American women